Geoffrey Martin Turner (born 16 March 1934) is a retired bishop of the Church of England.  He was the sixth Suffragan Bishop of Stockport.

Turner was educated at Bideford Grammar School, the Royal Military Academy Sandhurst and Oak Hill Theological College. Ordained in 1963, he was a curate in Tonbridge and then Vicar of St Peter's Derby.  He was then Rural Dean of Wirral until his ordination to the episcopate in 1994. He resigned in 2000 and in retirement is an honorary assistant bishop in the Diocese of Chester.

References

1934 births
Bishops of Stockport
20th-century Church of England bishops
Living people
Graduates of the Royal Military Academy Sandhurst
Alumni of Oak Hill College